Brian Ó Flaithbheartaigh (died 1377) was a possible Taoiseach of Iar Connacht and Chief of the Name.

Reign

Brian may have been Taoiseach, but he is not explicitly named as such in his obituary.

Annalistic reference

 1377. Walter, son of Sir David Burke; Donnell, son of Farrell, son of the Manach O'Gallagher; Geoffrey O'Flanagan, Chief of Clann-Chathail; Donough, son of William Alainn; O'Carroll, Lord of Ely; Dermot Bacagh Mac Branan, Chief of Corcachlann; Faghtna, son of David O'More; and Brian O'Flaherty, died.

See also

 Ó Flaithbertaigh

References

 West or H-Iar Connaught Ruaidhrí Ó Flaithbheartaigh, 1684 (published 1846, ed. James Hardiman).
 Origin of the Surname O'Flaherty, Anthony Matthews, Dublin, 1968, p. 40.
 CELT: Corpus of Electronic Texts at University College Cork

People from County Galway
Medieval Gaels from Ireland
1377 deaths
Brian
14th-century Irish people
Year of birth unknown
Irish lords